Robert M. Dueholm is a former member of the Wisconsin State Assembly.

Biography
Dueholm was born on June 7, 1945 in Frederic, Wisconsin. He graduated from high school in Luck, Wisconsin before graduating from the University of Wisconsin-River Falls and the University of Wisconsin-Madison. Dueholm is married with two children and is a member of the local chapter of the Humane Society of the United States and Pheasants Forever.

Career
Dueholm was first elected to the Assembly in 1994. He is a Democrat.

References

People from Frederic, Wisconsin
University of Wisconsin–River Falls alumni
University of Wisconsin–Madison alumni
1945 births
Living people
Democratic Party members of the Wisconsin State Assembly